Vladimir Yegorovich Yeremeyev (born 21 November 1988) is a former Russian professional football player. He is 175 centimeters tall and plays position midfield.

Club career
He played in the Russian Football National League for FC Fakel Voronezh in the 2011–12 season.

Personal life
He is married to Russian football player Oksana Yeremeyeva (nee Ryabinicheva).

References

External links
 
 

1988 births
Footballers from Voronezh
Living people
Russian footballers
FC Fakel Voronezh players
FC Metallurg Lipetsk players
Association football midfielders